Emil Sitka (December 22, 1914January 16, 1998) was a veteran American actor, who appeared in hundreds of movies, short films, and television shows, and is best known for his numerous appearances with The Three Stooges and he was the unofficial "last Stooge", since he was tapped to be the new middle Stooge when Larry Fine suffered a stroke in 1970. He is one of only two actors to have worked with all six Stooges (Shemp Howard, Moe Howard, Larry Fine, Curly Howard, Joe Besser, Joe DeRita) on film in the various incarnations of the group (Harold Brauer, a recurring villain who appeared in three 1940s shorts, was the other).

Sitka served the role of a literal "stooge," or straight man, to the Three Stooges throughout nearly 40 of their short films, most of which were filmed during Shemp's run as the third stooge. In addition to one single appearance during Curly's run with the trio, and a limited number of appearances during Besser's, Sitka returned as a near-regular character when the trio returned to film and television with DeRita. His frequent appearances with the trio, and his role as stooge to the stooges, have earned him the informal title of being the "fourth stooge".

Early life
Sitka was born in Johnstown, Pennsylvania in 1914. He was the oldest of five children, born of Slovak immigrant parents. His father, Emil Sitka Sr., a coal miner, died of black lung disease when Sitka was 12 years old, and his mother, Helena Matula Sitka, was hospitalized, unable to take care of the children. His siblings were placed in foster homes, but Sitka went to live in a church in Pittsburgh, Pennsylvania with a Catholic priest for the next few years. At this time, he became an altar boy and made plans to enter the priesthood, and had his first acting opportunity in the church's annual Passion Play. At the age of 16, he and one of his brothers traveled across the United States looking for work. After a year, they returned to Pittsburgh, where Sitka found a job working in a factory. He stayed there until the great St. Patrick's Day Pittsburgh Flood of 1936, after which he departed to pursue his dream of acting in Hollywood, California.

Acting career

Early acting experience
Sitka found inexpensive lodging in a small acting theater, doing handiwork to pay his rent, and gradually acting in small parts in the theater. With time and experience, the parts became larger, and eventually Sitka was directing plays as well. Since the theater did not pay, Emil always kept a job as a civil engineer to pay the bills as well as his acting career at night. By 1946, he had played dozens, if not hundreds of roles; this breadth of experience would help him in his later film career, playing everything from butler to lawyer to businessman to construction worker.

In films
In 1946, Sitka was leading his own acting troupe when he was spotted by a talent scout for Columbia Pictures. He was told to contact Jules White,  head of Columbia Pictures' short film department, and was cast in a short film that White was directing – Hiss and Yell, starring Barbara Jo Allen as her character "Vera Vague." Hiss and Yell was nominated for an Academy Award. Several months later, he was cast in his first Three Stooges film – Half-Wits Holiday, where he played the role as Sappington, the first footman. At the time, this episode was also the final starring role of Curly Howard, who suffered a stroke off screen and it marked the end of his career, thus making it one of only two shorts where Emil and Curly appeared together. The other short was Hold that Lion. Nevertheless, Sitka went on to appear in dozens of Three Stooges short films, as well as most of their feature films and the live action segments for The New Three Stooges 1965 cartoon series. He worked in both short films and feature films with others as well, including Lucille Ball, Milton Berle, Red Skelton, Tony Curtis, Alan Hale, Walter Brennan, Dan Blocker, Joey Bishop, Bob Denver, and many others. However, Sitka is best remembered for his association with the Three Stooges, and with one line in particular which he repeated several times: "Hold hands, you lovebirds!" from Brideless Groom (one of the four Three Stooges shorts that lapsed into the public domain and thus was distributed freely and widely).

In January 1970, Larry Fine suffered a stroke during the filming of Kook's Tour. Plans were in the works for Sitka to replace him as the Middle Stooge in early 1970 when Moe's grandson was working on a movie that called for having the Three Stooges in it. The project was called off after financing fell through, with Mr. Sitka resuming his previous activities. When Moe got a movie offer for the Stooges in 1974, he called Mr. Sitka and Joe DeRita together for accepting the offer, and commencing a full fledged revival of the Three Stooges as a current act. But nothing other than a few promotional pictures were ever made. This proposed version of the group would never transpire, due to Moe falling ill and dying shortly after its conception.

"Hold hands, you lovebirds"
In the Three Stooges short Brideless Groom (1947), Shemp Howard must be married before 6:00 p.m. in order to inherit $500,000. After striking out, Shemp finally finds a girl willing to marry him, and they rush off to a justice of the peace (Sitka). As he starts the ceremony, initially telling the couple to "hold hands, you lovebirds", the other girls that turned down Shemp's proposal burst in, having heard of the inheritance. A free-for-all then ensues, with poor Sitka being struck again and again, attempting to start the ceremony, each time more disheveled and his "hold hands, you lovebirds" rather weaker.

Because of the widespread distribution of this short (it is one of four Three Stooges shorts that slipped into the public domain and was broadcast countless times on local television stations as a result), this scene is the one that Sitka has become best known for.

Notably, a clip of this short is featured in Pulp Fiction (1994), for which Sitka's name even appears in the credits as "Hold Hands You Lovebirds." Emil also utters the phrase in his cameo as a supermarket customer in the horror film Intruder (1989).

Later years
Sitka continued with his acting career, more out of love for acting than the need for money, appearing in films as late as 1992. He was in demand at various Three Stooges conventions, and had numerous requests from Three Stooges fans to appear at their wedding to say "Hold hands, you lovebirds!"

Additionally, Sitka appeared as a contestant on Let's Make a Deal in 1985, bringing along a drawing of silent film star Ben Turpin, which host Monty Hall remarked on when choosing him. After being given $500 by Hall and offered the chance to trade it for an unknown item, Sitka opted to keep the money and avoided a "zonk" prize of his-and-hers garbage cans.

Personal life
Sitka and first wife Donna Driscoll married in the 1940s and divorced in the 1960s. He married longtime girlfriend Edith Weber in the 1970s; they were married until her death in 1981.

Sitka had seven children: daughters Elonka and Little-Star; and sons Rudigor, Storm, Tao, Darrow, and Saxon. All children are from the first marriage. Saxon carries on his father's legacy by appearing at Stooge conventions as often as possible.

Death
While hosting several Stooge fans in his home in June 1997, Sitka suffered a massive stroke and never regained consciousness (one fan was a certified EMT and was able to keep Sitka alive until paramedics arrived). He died on January 16, 1998, in Camarillo, California, less than a month after his 83rd birthday.

He is interred next to his wife Edith at Conejo Mountain Memorial Park in Camarillo. As a tribute to his tenure with the Stooges, Sitka's gravestone reads "Hold hands, you lovebirds!", as well as "He danced all the way."

Selected filmography

 One Exciting Week (1946) as Councilman (uncredited)
 Half-Wits Holiday (1947, Short) as Sappington (uncredited)
 Hold That Lion! (1947, Short) as Attorney
 Brideless Groom (1947, Short) as Justice of the Peace J.M. Benton (uncredited)
 All Gummed Up (1947, Short) as Amos Flint
 Joe Palooka in Fighting Mad (1948) as Photographer
 Pardon My Clutch (1948, Short) as Professor Otto Klink (uncredited)
 Blondie's Secret (1948) as Grocery Store Clerk (uncredited)
 Who Done It? (1949, Short) as Mr. John Goodrich
 The Beautiful Blonde from Bashful Bend (1949) as Hoodlum (uncredited)
 Fuelin' Around (1949, Short) as Prof. Sneed
 Blondie Hits the Jackpot (1949) as Swedish Plaster Mixer (uncredited)
 Vagabond Loafers (1949, Short) as Mr. Walter Norfleet
 Feudin' Rhythm (1949) as Comic Actor (uncredited)
 And Baby Makes Three (1949) as Baseball Fan (uncredited)
 Punchy Cowpunchers (1950, Short) as Capt. Daley
 Hugs and Mugs (1950, Short) as Clerk (uncredited)
 The Good Humor Man (1950) as Street Cleaner (uncredited)
 Beware of Blondie (1950) as Trash Collector (uncredited)
 Rock Island Trail (1950) as Railroad Fireman in Bar (uncredited)
 Kill the Umpire (1950) as Irate Baseball Fan (uncredited)
 Texas Dynamo (1950) as Turkey
 Three Hams on Rye (1950, Short) as B.K. Doaks
 The Fuller Brush Girl (1950) as Man Stomping on Hair Folicle (uncredited)
 Slaphappy Sleuths (1950, Short) as Emil, a Customer
 Emergency Wedding (1950) as Man in Department Store (uncredited)
 Gasoline Alley (1951) as Martini (uncredited)
 Bowery Battalion (1951) as Albert - Officers Club Waiter (uncredited)
 Fighting Coast Guard (1951) as Chief Boatswain Mate (uncredited)
 Scrambled Brains (1951, Short) as Doctor Geseundheit
 Let's Go Navy! (1951) as Mailman (uncredited)
 A Millionaire for Christy (1951) as Moving Man (uncredited)
 Merry Mavericks (1951, Short) as Mort (uncredited)
 Corky of Gasoline Alley (1951) as House Painter / Irate Neighbor (uncredited)
 The Well (1951) as Lunch Counter Customer (uncredited)
 The Tooth Will Out (1951, Short) as Italian Chef (uncredited)
 Hula-La-La (1951, Short) as Mr. Baines
 The Sea Hornet (1951) as Waiter
 Pest Man Wins (1951, Short) as Meadows
 Harem Girl (1952) as Abdul's Servant (uncredited)
 Listen, Judge (1952, Short) as The Chef
 Gobs and Gals (1952) as Dressing Man (uncredited)
 Sound Off (1952) as Waiter (uncredited)
 Gents in a Jam (1952, Short) as Uncle Phineas Bowman
 Tropical Heat Wave (1952) as Uniformed Police Officer (uncredited)
 All Ashore (1953) as Bartender (uncredited)
 Loose Loot (1953, Short) as Atty. Poole (uncredited) (stock footage)
 A Perilous Journey (1953) as Drunk (uncredited)
 Gun Belt (1953) as Townsman (uncredited)
 Bubble Trouble (1953, Short) as Amos Flint / Gorilla
 Private Eyes (1953) as Patient in Wheelchair (uncredited)
 Geraldine (1953) as Engineer (uncredited)
 Jungle Gents (1954) as Boat Crewman (uncredited)
 Carolina Cannonball (1955) as Technician
 Timberjack (1955) as Jim (uncredited)
 Three for the Show (1955) as First Taxicab Driver (uncredited)
 Blackboard Jungle (1955) as Father (uncredited)
 Gypped in the Penthouse (1955) as Charlie
 Stone Age Romeos (1955) as B. Bopper
 Jail Busters (1955) as Mug Shot Photographer (uncredited)
 My Sister Eileen (1955) as Bit Welder (uncredited)
 The Spoilers (1955) as Miner (uncredited)
 Husbands Beware (1956) as J.M. Benton - Justice of the Peace (uncredited)
 For Crimin' Out Loud (1956) as Councilman John Goodrich (archive footage)
 Hot Stuff (1956) as Professor Sneed (archive footage)
 Crashing Las Vegas (1956) as Man in Seat 87 (uncredited)
 Thunder Over Arizona (1956) as Man Hit by Pie (uncredited)
 Scheming Schemers (1956) as Mr. Walter Norfleet
 The White Squaw (1956) as Texas Jim (uncredited)
 Commotion on the Ocean (1956) as Smitty
 Affair in Reno (1956) as Cashier (uncredited)
 The Phantom Stagecoach (1957) as Johnson (uncredited)
 The 27th Day (1957) as Newspaper Hawker (uncredited)
 Horsing Around (1957) as Circus Attendant
 Outer Space Jitters (1957) as Professor Jones
 Return to Warbow (1958) as Townsman (uncredited)
 Quiz Whizz (1958) as J.J. Figby
 Pies and Guys (1958) as Sappington
 Flying Saucer Daffy (1958) as Mr. Barton—President of 'Facts and Figures' Magazine
 Who Was That Lady? (1960) as Man with Flower Pot (uncredited)
 The Three Stooges Meet Hercules (1962) as Shepherd / Refreshment Man
 The Three Stooges in Orbit (1962) as Professor Danforth
 13 Frightened Girls (1963) as Ludwig (uncredited)
 The Three Stooges Go Around the World in a Daze (1963) as Butler at Men's Club (uncredited)
 The Outlaws Is Coming (1965) as Mr. Abernathy / Witch doctor / Cavalry colonel
 Who's Minding the Mint? (1967) as Janitor (uncredited)
 The Mad Room (1969) as Workman (uncredited)
 Watermelon Man (1970) as Delivery Man
 Crimewave (1985) as Colonel Rodgers
 Intruder (1989) as Mr. Abernathy
 The Nutt House (1992) as Geeves (final film role)
 Pulp Fiction (1994) as 'Hold Hands You Love Birds' (archive footage)

References

External links

 Emil Sitka Official website
 
 Emil Sitka at threestooges.net
 

1914 births
1998 deaths
Male actors from Pittsburgh
American male film actors
American male television actors
American male comedians
20th-century American comedians
American people of Slovak descent
People from Johnstown, Pennsylvania
20th-century American male actors